Hannah Ritchie (born 1993) is a British data scientist, senior researcher at the University of Oxford in the Oxford Martin School and head of research at Our World in Data. Her research investigates the assessment of global food systems and visualising data from the COVID-19 pandemic. Her first book, The First Generation, is due to be published by Chatto & Windus.

Early life and education 
Ritchie trained in environmental science at the University of Edinburgh. She earned her undergraduate degree in environmental geoscience and a master's degree in carbon management. She remained in Scotland for her PhD, where her research investigated malnutrition and global food systems. She created a scalable framework to understand food system pathways and identify losses, allocations and conversions. In particular, she looked to understand whether it was possible to feed a growing population without damaging the environment.

Research and career 
Ritchie started her career as a lecturer in sustainability at the University of Edinburgh. She developed teaching programmes focussed on sustainability. She left Edinburgh to start a research position at the University of Oxford, where she developed data visualisations to communicate information.

Ritchie's early work considered food systems and how it was essential to adapt to meet the Sustainable Development Goals. For example, she has argued that for most foods, the carbon footprint is barely impacted by transport. In 2017, Ritchie joined Our World in Data as head of research. During the COVID-19 pandemic, Ritchie built the Our World in Data COVID-19 information dashboard.

In 2022, Chatto & Windus announced that they will publish Ritchie's first book, The First Generation. The book explores Ritchie's optimism for large-scale problem solving and ending climate change.

Selected publications 
Coronavirus Pandemic (COVID-19)
A global database of COVID-19 vaccination
CO₂ and Greenhouse Gas Emissions
World Population Growth

References 

1993 births
Living people
Alumni of the University of Edinburgh
Data scientists